Aubigné-sur-Layon (literally Aubigné on Layon) is a commune in the Maine-et-Loire department in western France.

Geography
The river Layon forms all of the commune's northern border.

Population

See also
Communes of the Maine-et-Loire department

References

External links

Official site

Communes of Maine-et-Loire